Sungshin Women's University (Korean: 성신여자대학교) is a private women's university located in Seoul, South Korea. It was founded in 1936 by Dr. Sook-Chong Lee. During the 1960s and 70s, Sungshin was a Teachers College in South Korea. Then, in the 1980s, the college was promoted to the status of a comprehensive university. Today, the university comprises ten colleges and five graduate schools, with total enrollment of about 12,000 students.  In 2006, the university rebuilt the Sungshin Hall to mark the university's 70th anniversary. Also, Sungshin Women's University has succeeded to annex the nursing college of a national hospital, the first event of its kind to happen in South Korea. The admission criteria for Sungshin Women's University is generally the KSAT score of the top 10% of the nation. Further, It is ranked 591-600 in the QS world university ranking 2023.

History 

 1936.04.28 Sungshin Girls' School is established by Dr. Lee Sook Chong
 1965.01.13 Sungshin Women's Teachers College is established
 1972.01.28 The Graduate School is established
 1979.10.18 The name is changed to Sungshin Women's College.
 1979.12.05 The Graduate School of Information and Industries is established.
 1981.07.31 The college is promoted to the status of university.
 1981.10.20  New establishment and reorganization of  courses, new establishment of the colleges of Humanities, Social Sciences, Natural Sciences, Education, and Arts.
 1982.10.05 The College of Natural Sciences divided and reorganized into the College of Family Sciences (College of Human Ecology)
 1983.10.29 The Graduate School of Education is established
 1988.08.30 Dedication of the Woonjung Building.
 1988.10.29 The College of Arts was divided into the College of Music and College of Fine Arts
 1994.10.21 The Graduate School of Industry was divided into the Graduate School of Plastic Industry (Graduate School of Arts and Design) and the Graduate School of Information Industry (Graduate School of Cultural Industry)
 1995.01.10 Dedication of the Soo-Jung Building
 1995.03.01 The Continuing Education Center is established.
 1997.10.25 The Graduate School of Human Resource Management is established.
 1999.02.12 The Ministry of Education's Overall University Evaluation ranked Sungshin's undergraduate program as "excellent" and its graduate program as "most excellent"
 1995.01.10 Dedication of the Nan-Hyang Building
 2003.09.21 Dedication of the Media Information Center
 2003.12.24 Awarded "The ISO 9001:2000 Certification for Academic and Business Administration System"
 2004.09.18 Selected by the Ministry of Human Resources and Education in 2004 as a "University of Excellence with a Distinctive Project."
 2005.01.20 The opening of the Family Health & Welfare Center
 2005.06.30 Selected by the Ministry of Human Resources and Education for two consecutive years as a "University of Excellence with a Distinctive Project."
 2006.02.20 The Ministry of Education's Overall University Evaluation ranked Sungshin's undergraduate program as "excellent" and its graduate program as  "excellent."
 2006.07.25 Selected by the Ministry of Human Resources and Education for three consecutive years as a "University of Excellence with a Distinctive Project."
 2006.11.30 Dedication of the Sungshin Building
 2007.03.01 Establishment of the College of Nursing
 2007.08.11 Inauguration of the eighth university president, Dr. Shim Hwa-jin
 2008.04.15 Proclamation of a Vision — Construction of Sungshin Woonjung Campus (SSWU Second Campus)
 2017.02.07 President Shim Hwa-jin is convicted by a Seoul court of embezzling school funds and is subsequently imprisoned.
 2018.01.23 President Kim Ho-syung announces plans to discuss making the university co-educational and using trading name Sungshin University without women's in their English name for preparing co-educational system.

Academics 

Sungshin Women's University comprises ten colleges (45 departments) and five graduate schools.

Undergraduate colleges
 College of Humanities
 College of Social Sciences
 College of Law
 College of Natural Sciences
 College of Human Ecology
 College of Nursing
 College of Education
 College of Arts
 College of Music
 College of Convergence Culture and Arts

Second campus (Woonjung Green Campus)
Sungshin has established a second campus in Seoul. The 54,200 m2 Woonjung Green Campus is within 5 kilometers of the Soojung Campus and makes Sungshin the only university with two campuses in Seoul.

The Woonjung Green Campus, with three college buildings and one shared facilities building opened in March 2010 and houses four colleges:  College of Natural Sciences, College of Human Ecology, College of Nursing, and College of Convergence Culture and Arts. Woonjung Green Campus.

Public transit access  
Sungshin Women's University is located at a transportation hub, with both campuses near major subway stations. The north-running Ui-Sinseol Rapid Transit Light metro line opened in 2017 and connected to  Sungshin Women's University Station.

 Sungshin Women's University Station (Soojung Campus);  Mia Station (Woonjung Green Campus)

Special Programs

ROTC 
Sungshin Women's University has run a Reserve Officers' Training Corps programme for women who want to be recruited as soldiers by the Ministry of National Defense since 2011. Similar programmes are run by Sookmyung Women's University and Ewha Womans University; these three women's universities saw a total of 90 students join the programme in 2016.

Improvement in academic affairs

English competency and graduation requirements
Each department or major program will establish its own mandatory list of major courses to improve the competency level of its graduates. The number of major courses required for graduation will be increased and the same standard will be applied for the double major program. In addition, certification programs will be introduced for graduation and for English competency.

Comprehensive academic advisory system
The university has employed a new, comprehensive academic advisory system to help in academic and career advising. One faculty advisor will be assigned to about 15 first-year students. Also, 15 best faculty advisors will be assigned to 10 Open Major Division students each.

Bachelor's/master's degree program
The university established a combined bachelor's/master's degree program so that students can receive both the bachelor's and the master's degree in just five years: seven semesters for Bachelor's and three for Master's.

Controversy
Shim Hwa-jin, the granddaughter of founder Li Suk-jong, served as the university's president from 2007 for two terms. When she was once more elected as president for a third term, which would extend her incumbency to 2019, four members of the university's student association raised concerns that Shim had embezzled funds from the school, which led to their suspension in January 2016. The students successfully pursued a court case to have the suspension overturned, and it was struck down in October. Meanwhile, investigative journalists found that a prominent individual's daughter had been admitted to Sungshin after cheating in the assessment, while one of Shim's relatives had also been appointed as a tenure-track lecturer using a plagiarised dissertation.

Charges of embezzlement were brought against Shim and, on 7 February 2017, the Seoul Northern District Court returned a guilty verdict, concluding that Shim had embezzled 378 million won from school funds. She was demoted from her position as president and served nine days in prison before posting bail of 50 million won on 20 February. She was succeeded as president of Sungshin Women's University by Kim Ho-sung.

Notable alumni
Yang Bo Kyung, President of the university 2018-2022
Shim Hwa-jin, president of the university 2007–2017
Jungwon Kim, Professor at Columbia University 
Jain Kwon, Assistant Professor at Colorado State University
Keonghee Han, Associate Professor at the University of Wyoming

Entertainers
 Gong Seung-yeon, actress
 Goo Hara, actress and singer (KARA)
 Kimera, singer
 Lee Se-young, actress
 Yoon Chae-kyung, singer (Puretty, April, I.B.I and C.I.V.A)
 Kim Chaewon, singer (April)
 Yuju, singer (GFriend)
 Kim Yoon-ah, singer (Jaurim)
 Hyolyn, singer (Sistar)
 Soyou, singer (Sistar)
 Shin Do-hyun, actress

Athletes
 Jang Mi-ran, 2008 Summer Olympics gold medalist (weightlifting women's category (75 kg. and up))
 Nam Hyun-hee, 2008 Summer Olympics silver medalist (fencing women's foil)

Ranking 
QS World University Rankings 2023: 591-600

References

External links
Official website, in Korean and English

Educational institutions established in 1936
Sungshin Women's University
Women's universities and colleges in South Korea
1936 establishments in Korea
Seongbuk District